Abacoproeces molestus is a species of spider belonging to the family Linyphiidae.

It is native to Austria.

References

Linyphiidae
Spiders described in 1973
Spiders of Europe